Farimak (also Romanized as Farīmak) is a village in Zarem Rud Rural District, Hezarjarib District, Neka County, Mazandaran Province, Iran.

It is located in the Alborz (Elburz) mountain range.

At the 2006 census, its population was 144, in 41 families.

References 

Populated places in Neka County
Settled areas of Elburz